Al-Adel is a neighborhood of Baghdad, Iraq. 

Adel